Christopher P. Azzano is a retired United States Air Force major general who last served as the commander of the Air Force Test Center. Previously, he was the director of air, space, and cyberspace operations of the Air Force Materiel Command.

He retired from active duty on July 16, 2021 (official retirement date is 1 October 2021) after relinquishing command of the Air Force Test Center to Evan C. Dertien the previous day.

Dates of promotion

References

External links

Year of birth missing (living people)
Living people
Place of birth missing (living people)
United States Air Force generals